Maharaja Theme Park is an amusement park located in Neelambur, Coimbatore, Tamil Nadu, India. The park also has movie screens attached with the park.

It was opened to the public in April 2006. Tamil Actor surya opened this theme park.

References 

Amusement parks in Tamil Nadu
Tourist attractions in Coimbatore
2006 establishments in Tamil Nadu
Amusement parks opened in 2006